Erotic horror, alternately called horror erotica or dark erotica, is a term applied to works of fiction in which sensual or sexual imagery are blended with horrific overtones or story elements for the sake of sexual titillation. Horror fiction of this type is most common in literature and film. Erotic horror films are a cornerstone of Spanish horror.

See also
 Erotic thriller
 Monster erotica
 Dinosaur erotica
 Ero guro

References

Further reading 
 
 

 
Horror genres
Horror